Miguel Arteta (born August 29, 1965) is a Puerto Rican director of film and television, known for his independent film Chuck & Buck (2000), for which he received the Independent Spirit John Cassavetes Award, and for the films The Good Girl (2002) and Cedar Rapids (2011).

Early life
Born in San Juan, Puerto Rico, to a Peruvian father and Spanish mother, Arteta grew across Latin America due to his father's job as a Chrysler auto parts salesman. He went to high school in Costa Rica but was expelled, and went to live with his sister in Boston, Massachusetts, graduating from The Cambridge School of Weston in Massachusetts. He then attended Harvard University's documentary program where he learned filmmaking. He eventually left for Wesleyan University, where he met future collaborators Matthew Greenfield and Mike White.

After graduating in 1989, his student film Every Day is a Beautiful Day won a Student Academy Award, which got him a job as a second assistant camera to Jonathan Demme on the documentary Cousin Bobby. Demme then recommended him to the AFI Conservatory, and Arteta received his MFA there in 1993.

Career
Arteta's first film, Star Maps, is a dark tale of a Mexican teenage boy and aspiring actor who is pimped by his father as a male prostitute in Los Angeles. It debuted at the Sundance Film Festival. It was a critical hit, receiving five Independent Spirit Award nominations, including Best First Feature and Best First Screenplay. He then turned to directing television shows, helming episodes of Homicide: Life on the Street, Freaks and Geeks, and Six Feet Under. He has also since directed episodes of The Office, Ugly Betty, and American Horror Story.

Arteta achieved critical acclaim and won a 2001 Independent Spirit Award for Best Feature Under $500,000 for Chuck & Buck, which teamed him with his fellow Wesleyan alumni Greenfield (film producer) and White (screenwriter and star). It is a story of male friendship and homoerotic desire, featuring a 27-year old man who tracks down his former best friend and stalks him, hoping to re-enact their childhood sex games. The trio worked together once more on 2002's The Good Girl, starring Jennifer Aniston, a retelling of Flaubert's Madame Bovary set in the American Midwest.

Arteta's Youth in Revolt, a comedy starring Michael Cera, was released in 2010. Arteta's Cedar Rapids, starring Ed Helms and produced by Alexander Payne, was released in 2011. Most recently he reunited with White and directed four episodes of White's HBO series Enlightened.

Arteta re-teamed with Mike White on Beatriz at Dinner, which starred Salma Hayek and John Lithgow. It had its world premiere at the Sundance Film Festival in January 2017, and was released in June 2017, by Roadside Attractions. Arteta next directed Duck Butter, which he co-wrote alongside Alia Shawkat who starred in the film alongside Laia Costa, the film was shot over the course of nine days with the majority being shot over the course of 24 hours. It had its world premiere at the Tribeca Film Festival on April 20, 2018. and was released on April 27, 2018. The film received mixed reviews from film critics.

In 2020, Arteta directed Like a Boss, starring Tiffany Haddish, Rose Byrne and re-teaming with Hayek, which was released on January 10 by Paramount Pictures. He directed Yes Day, starring Jennifer Garner and Jenna Ortega for Netflix.

Filmography

Awards and nominations

Accolades

References

External links

Miguel Arteta's work at Lumen Eclipse
Miguel Arteta at IFFR
Miguel Arteta Biography

1965 births
Puerto Rican television directors
Independent Spirit Award winners
Living people
AFI Conservatory alumni
Puerto Rican film directors
Wesleyan University alumni
Puerto Rican people of Spanish descent
People from San Juan, Puerto Rico
Artists from Boston